The Tocbești is a left tributary of the river Gădălin in Romania. It flows into the Gădălin near Jucu de Sus.

References

Rivers of Romania
Rivers of Cluj County